Members of the British Liberal Party's Frontbench Team from 1945 to 1956 (leaderships listed chronologically):

Clement Davies: Liberal Party Leader
Tom Horabin: Chief Whip

Changes
1946: Tom Horabin defects to Labour Party and is replaced as Chief Whip by Frank Byers
July 1949: Violet Bonham Carter becomes Deputy Leader of the party
February 1950: Jo Grimond replaces Frank Byers as Chief Whip
1952: Arthur Holt becomes Parliamentary Chairman of the Liberal Party.
1955: Arthur Holt replaced as Parliamentary Chairman of the Liberal Party.

20th century in the United Kingdom
Liberal Party (UK)
1945 establishments in the United Kingdom
1956 disestablishments in the United Kingdom